The Squier Super-Sonic is an electric guitar manufactured by the Fender Musical Instruments Corporation, originally marketed under their Squier brand. The design, conceived by former Squier marketing manager Joe Carducci, is said to have been inspired by a photograph in which Jimi Hendrix is pictured playing a Fender Jaguar upside down.

Design
The Super-Sonic features an offset body similar to an upside-down Fender Jaguar or Jazzmaster, but with two humbucker pickups, a three-way pickup selector toggle switch, and a traditional Stratocaster-style six-screw vibrato bridge. Unusually, the Super-Sonic has no tone control and instead has only a volume control for each pickup, wired in reverse with the control closest to the bridge controlling the bridge pickup, and the control farthest from the neck controlling the neck pickup. Like many other Fender offset designs, the Super-Sonic is a short-scale (24 inch) guitar, and also features a 22-fret bolt-on neck with a reversed CBS-style large headstock.

Variations

Squier Vista Series
The Super-Sonic was originally a part of the Japanese-manufactured Vista Series, and produced at the FujiGen factory between 1996 and 1998. The bodies were constructed from basswood and available in four different finishes, with a maple neck with a rosewood fretboard. The pickups were manufactured in South Korea with ceramic magnets with wooden spacers, and the bridge pickup canted. Instruments produced between 1996 through 1997 are accepted to have had serial numbers beginning 'V', while those from late 1997 through the end of production in 1998 generally begin with 'A'. Following the cessation of production of the Vista Series, FujiGen-manufactured Super-Sonics have become increasingly sought-after and collectible.

Fender Pawn Shop Series
Fender reintroduced the Super-Sonic in 2013 as part of the Fender-branded Pawn Shop Series. The reissued Super-Sonic was manufactured at the Fender factory in Mexico and featured an alder body available in three new finishes, a C-shaped maple neck, a rosewood fretboard with a 9.5 inch radius, and medium-jumbo frets. The South Korean-made pickups on the Vista Series models were replaced with Fender Atomic humbuckers, and both canted.

Squier Paranormal Series
The Super-Sonic was once again reintroduced to the Fender catalogue in June 2020 as part of the Squier Paranormal Series. The revived model features a poplar body available in two different finishes, a C-shaped maple neck, an Indian laurel fretboard with a 9.5 inch radius, and narrow-tall frets. Like the version from the Pawn Shop Series, the Paranormal Series Super-Sonic features Fender Atomic humbuckers.

Limited Edition Made in Japan
In 2021, Fender released a Japan-exclusive, limited edition Fender-branded Super-Sonic. It was largely a faithful reproduction of the original Vista Series models, and like the originals was manufactured in Japan and featured a basswood body, a rosewood fretboard with a 9.5 inch radius, and medium jumbo frets, but with Fender Dragster BB humbuckers not seen on previous incarnations of the Super-Sonic.

Notable players
  Alex Fischel (Spoon)
 Nick Reinhart (Tera Melos)
 Omar Rodríguez-López (At the Drive-In, The Mars Volta)
 Leticia Wolf/Meta Dead (The Dead Deads)

References

Fender electric guitars